Eleven ships of the Royal Navy have borne the name HMS Assistance:

  was a 50-gun ship launched in 1650, rebuilt in 1699, 1712 and 1725, and sunk in 1746 as a breakwater.
  was a 50-gun fourth rate launched in 1747 and sold in 1773.
  was a transport launched in 1771 and sold in 1802.
  was a 50-gun fourth rate launched in 1781 and wrecked in 1802.
 HMS Assistance was a prison hulk, launched in 1769 as the 74-gun third rate . She became a prison hulk in 1796, was renamed HMS Assistance in 1805 and was broken up in 1815.
  was a storeship launched in 1809 at Deptford and sold in 1821.
  was a discovery vessel, formerly the merchant vessel Baboo. She was purchased in 1850 and abandoned in the Arctic in 1854.
  was a screw storeship purchased in 1855 and wrecked in 1860.
  was an iron screw storeship launched in 1874 and sold in 1897.
  was a repair ship launched in 1944 and transferred to the Royal Navy under lend-lease. She was returned to the US Navy in 1946.

See also

References

Royal Navy ship names
Assistance